Robert Whitaker (born 26 January 1983) is a British show jumper who rides for the British Team.

Career 
Whitaker has represented the British Team many times from junior pony level to the senior ranks.

One of Whitaker's career highlights to date was becoming the British Open Champion at the inaugural British Open Show Jumping Championships in 2003. He has since been crowned champion again in 2008 and 2009. He has now won the title a total of 3 times.

Whitaker has ridden many horses at the highest level. Some of his many horses include Lacroix, his winner at the British Open, and Finbarr, a very successful puissance specialist. He has also previously ridden the horse Arko, now competing successfully with Nick Skelton.

Personal life 
Whitaker is the son of the John Whitaker, nephew of Michael Whitaker and cousin of both Ellen and William Whitaker.

Whitaker married Kate Jackman in Barbados, on 13 January 2015.  They have a daughter, Evie.

Horses

Current
 Lacroix
 Omelli (*1996) Stallion sired by: Burggraf, damsire: Kelly, Owner: Tim Gredley
 Cleopatra VI (*2002), Mare, Father: Skippy II, Owner: Tim Gredley
 Varmisch (*2002), Mare, Father: Hattrick, Mother's Father: Larmisch, Owner: Tim Gredley
 B F Utopia (*1996), Stallion, Father: Lord Z, Owner: Gredley

former show horses:
 Arko

References 

1983 births
Living people
British show jumping riders
British male equestrians